Panama produces three brands of rum and a similar liquor known as Seco Herrerano, but beer is also quite popular. There are multiple brands produced by six companies.

List of beers of Panama

Animal Brew
Small independent brewpub in El Cangrejo neighborhood
 Skaters - IPA network of mango and raspberries
 Quimera - Mocha Mint Stout
 Summer Time - Pineapple Blonde Ale
 Bloodshed - Hardcore Red Ale
 SPV - Golden IPA
 Villalobos - Brown Ale
 THC - Black IPA
 Punto Rojo - Belgian Red IPA
 Tia Yeya - Session IPA
 Night & Fun - Strawberry Blonde Ale
 Anarquia - Stout Red Fruits
 La Blanca - White IPA
 Santa Catalina Piñas - Wheat Beer
 Antisociales - Pale Ale
 Villalovers - Brown Ale
- Source:

Casa Bruja
Independent craft brewery established in Costa Del Este Industrial Park, Panama City, in December 2013, with a second taproom in the old city (Casa Bruja Casco Antiguo). 
 Chivoperro
 Talingo
 Sandokan
 Fula
 Sir Francis
 Talias
 Tulivieja
– Source:

Cervecería Barú-Panama
 Cristal
 Panama
A popular beer, the Panama brand is also the strongest marketer, with T-shirts and other merchandise bearing its name seen around the Americas. It is distributed in some parts of the world by Royal Imports, LLC.
 Soberana
 other brands
on a contract basis, including Heineken, Guinness, Warsteiner, Tecate, and as of recently, Budweiser.

– Source:

Cervecería Clandestina
 Doppelbock
a traditional German style, a Lager with a very Panamanian touch: organic cacao from the tropical islands of Bocas del Toro, and coffee from the mountains of Chiriquí. With a brilliant chocolate color, it has an aroma with malted notes, caramel fruit, cacao and coffee. Has a malty flavor with suite coffee, coco and dried fruit, and a well-balanced bitterness. It is silky with a strong body and a dry finish.
 Intriga
a refreshing Witbier. It has a light golden color and a creamy, persistent foam. it has aromas of banana and citrics, and in its flavors predominate citric notes and a subtle sweetness, with an easy ending. 5.2% ABV, 13 IBU
 Ley Seca
a Pale Ale, with hints of the Strong Bitter English style. It has a deep amber color and a dense and persistent white foam. Its aroma and flavor are enhanced by its malt character and caramel and toffee notes, and a light bitterness with citric and floral hints. A very drinkable beer with intense flavor. 5.6% ABV, 28 IBU
 Nomada
A craft Pilsner. With a brilliant golden color and lightly turbid as it is not filtered, nor do they use additives to clarify the beer. It has an intense satisfying flavor. 5.0% ABV, 18 IBU.

– Source:

Cervecería Central
 Guachiman
 Lager Tija
 River Down
 Veranera
 Bocas Town

– Source:

Cervecería Nacional

Owned by Grupo Bavaria of Colombia, which is in turn now owned by SABMiller. 
 Atlas
A light beer, this is one of the two most popular, and is considered very similar to beers in the United States, often compared to Bud Light or Miller Light in reviews. It is the most popular beer in Panama.
Atlas Golden Light
It's the same beer as Atlas, but lighter.

 Balboa
Compared both to darker North American brands, and to stout European varieties. Like many things in Panama, it is named after conquistador Vasco Núñez de Balboa.
Balboa Ice

– Source:

La Rana Dorada
Small independent brewery
 Blanche/Belga
 Pale Ale
 Porte
 Premium Pils

– Source:

2 Oceans Brewing
Independent craft brewery from Panama City, Panama.
 Tropty
India Pale Ale (5.15% ABV, 75 IBU) - a dry-hopped IPA made with various citric hops. It is a refreshing and juicy IPA inspired from the New England IPA style.
 Switch
Blonde Ale (5.00% ABV, 20 IBU) - Switch is a light-bodied aromatic ale inspired from the refreshing Pilsner style and fermented with ale yeast. 
 Invasion
American Pale Ale (5.00% ABV, 33 IBU) - Invasion is a traditional American Pale Ale focused on heavy notes of caramel with a dry finish.
 Witnic
Belgian Witbier (5.00% ABV, 17 IBU) - Witnic is a traditional Belgian wit, a traditional style that combines wheat, orange peel and coriander.

- Source:

Controversies
In one of many corporate scandals of businesses financing Colombian paramilitaries, allegations surround Cervecería Nacional for having union workers killed by the armed right-wing groups .

See also

 Beer and breweries by region

References

 
Panama